Shindisi is a 2019 Georgian drama film directed by Dito Tsintsadze. It was screened at the 2019 Shanghai International Film Festival. It was selected as the Georgian entry for the Best International Feature Film at the 92nd Academy Awards, but it was not nominated. It won the Grand Prix at the 35th Warsaw International Film Festival in 2019.

Plot
Based on the true story of villagers from Shindisi engaged in saving wounded Georgian soldiers ambushed by Russian troops despite a ceasefire during the Russo-Georgian War.

Cast
 Dato Bakhtadze
 Goga Pipinashvili

See also
 List of submissions to the 92nd Academy Awards for Best International Feature Film
 List of Georgian submissions for the Academy Award for Best International Feature Film

References

External links
 

2019 films
2019 drama films
2010s Georgian-language films
Films directed by Dito Tsintsadze
Drama films from Georgia (country)
2010s Russian-language films